Fitzclarence Anstey John Caselberg (19 August 1927 – 16 April 2004) was a New Zealand writer.

Caselberg was born at Wakefield, south of Nelson, in 1927 and educated at Nelson College from 1936 to 1944.

His work ranged through poetry and playwriting to short stories and essays. Along with his wife, artist Anna Caselberg, he was at the centre of a thriving art and literary milieu which included his good friend and collaborator Colin McCahon, father-in-law Toss Woollaston, and writer Charles Brasch. Caselberg was awarded the Robert Burns Fellowship from the University of Otago in 1961.

He died in Dunedin in 2004.

The Caselberg Trust, a charitable trust supporting artists, is named in honour of John and Anna Caselberg. The Trust awards an amount of money each year to an aspiring artist or writer.

Publications
 Chart to My Country, John Caselberg. European travel notes, art criticism and stories of "Cultural Contact". John McIndoe Ltd, Dunedin, 1973.

References

1927 births
2004 deaths
People from Wakefield, New Zealand
People educated at Nelson College
New Zealand writers
People from Otago Peninsula
People associated with The Group (New Zealand art)